The ATM Forum was founded in 1991 to be the industry consortium to promote Asynchronous Transfer Mode technology used in telecommunication networks; the founding president and chairman was Fred Sammartino of Sun Microsystems.  It was a non-profit international organization.  The ATM Forum created over 200 implementation agreements.

History
In 1996 ATM technology stabilized with the "Anchorage Accord", which established the baseline of ATM implementations.  While ATM did not live up to every expectation, it remained an important core network technology. 
The Frame Relay Forum (promoting Frame Relay) also started in 1991. The MPLS Forum (which supported Multiprotocol Label Switching  had begun in 2000. Those two merged in 2003 to become the MPLS and Frame Relay Alliance (MFA).
In 2005, the ATM Forum joined forces with the MFA to form the MFA Forum, which was renamed to be the IP/MPLS Forum.
In May 2009 the  IP/MPLS Forum merged with the Broadband Forum.

Sampling of specifications
 ATM-MPLS Network Interworking
 Multi-Protocol Over ATM
 TM 4.1
 User-Network Interface
 B-ICI
 ANNI
 PNNI
 Frame-based ATM
 ILMI
 622.08 Mbit/s physical layer
 Inverse ATM Mux
 Circuit Emulation Service
 ATM Security Framework

Circuit Emulation Service
A widely adopted specification to emerge from the ATM Forum was the Circuit Emulation Service specification (CES).  This specification defined a method of creating a service out of mapping TDM DS0 and DS1/E1 Plesiochronous Digital Hierarchy (PDH) signals into Asynchronous Transfer Mode (ATM) cells.  It also supported J2 and DS-3 signals.  The service was built around the ATM Adaption Layer 1 specification from the ITU.  The 1.0 version was approved about 1995 and the 2.0 version was approved in January 1997.

References

External links
 ATM Forum
 ATM Forum Interoperability Agreements
 MFA Forum

Technology consortia